Adam Hughes is an American comic book illustrator.

Adam Hughes may also refer to:
Adam Hughes (soccer) (born 1982), Australian association footballer
 Adam Hughes (poet) (born 1982), American poet
 Adam Hughes (rugby, born 1977), English born Welsh rugby league and rugby league footballer
 Adam Hughes (rugby union, born 1990), Welsh rugby union player
 Adam Hughes (volleyball) (born 1986), American volleyball coach
 Adam Munson, also known as Adam Hughes, fictional character

See also  
 Hughes (surname)